The National Union of Students LGBT+ Campaign is an LGBT advocacy group that is part of Liberation Campaign Committee of the National Union of Students (NUS). The full-time officer accountable for the LGBT+ Campaign is the vice-president equality and liberation officer.

Campaigns 

The NUS LGBT are mostly nationally recognisable for their high-profile campaigns.

Donation, Not Discrimination 
The Donation, Not Discrimination campaign, which carried the tag line "It's time to end the ban", was a campaign to end the National Blood Service's discrimination against men who have had sex with other men, and women who have had sex with those men; the NBS would not allow them to give blood, a policy built upon the claim that gay men have a higher chance of carrying HIV. The campaign believed the lifetime ban to be discriminatory, and that it perpetuated the myth that AIDS is a “gay disease”. It argued that selection criteria should not be based on sexual orientation, but on participation in high-risk behaviour, and that the number of HIV infections through blood transfusion had been reduced in those countries where this is the case. The campaign ended in 2011 when the Department of Health lifted the ban.

Putting the LGBT into FE
This campaign has been running since 2007 and is to help students in further education (FE) who want to set up or develop their LGBT groups. The campaign find that participation and support in FE insututions to be limited or non existent and this is to change this.

Annual conference

The NUS LGBT+ conference is an opportunity for LGBT students activists from across the UK to come together to set the direction for the campaign for the year ahead, to attend workshops and hear speakers, and to network with other LGBT students.

One of the key functions of the conference is to debate, pass policy which forms the basis of NUS LGBT+'s campaigning and to amend the constitution of the campaign. All changes to policy and the constitution are submitted by LGBT students or societies, up to 5 for each, previous to the conference which are then compiled by the steering committee.

At the conference there is the annual NUS LGBT Awards, which started in 2007, to help promote and support the societies which have done things that are considered to be above and beyond the standard.

Officers and committee members are elected at the annual conference by delegates.

National officers 
National officers within the campaign are elected paid officials who coordinate and fulfil the agenda of the campaign.

There are two officers for the NUS LGBT+ Campaign, one woman's place which is and is only elected by self identifying women and open place which is open to anyone who identifies within the membership of the campaign. The officers can only stand for two years before having to step down.

The first national officers were elected in 2000, after NUS Annual Conference voted to change the constitution in order for the positions to be created.

Committee members 
Committee members are elected representatives which help prioritise the agenda of the campaign and fulfill it.  There are currently fourteen positions on the committee of seven types.  The maximum term in office is two years in each type, and the representative must be elected each year.

Further education 
The further education representatives are elected by delegates who are in further education and is in further education at the time of election. There is currently two positions as further education representatives. They are elected to help tackle the lack of participation within the liberation campaign despite the majority of NUS's membership being further education and to improve further education for LGBT people. The current representatives are Lani Baird and Joe Vinson, elected at the NUS LGBT Conference 2012.

International 
The international representative is elected by delegates who identify as international students and can only be run for by someone who identifies as such. There is currently one international representative. They are elected to ensure international students are represented in the campaign.

Trans 
The Trans representatives are elected by delegates who identify as trans and can only be run for by someone who identifies as trans. There are currently two positions as Trans representatives. They are elected to help tackle transphobia in the campaign and support trans people in society and education.

Bi 
The Bi representative is elected by delegates who identify as bi (or who identify as being attracted to more than one sex under the bisexual umbrella, pansexuals, polysexuals, etc.) and can only be run for by someone who identifies as such. There is currently one position as bi representative. They are elected to help tackle biphobia in the campaign and support bi people in society and education. The current representatives are Lauren Connors and Matt Stanley, elected as a jobshare at the NUS LGBT Conference 2012.

Black 
The black representative comes from and are elected by a caucus of delegates who identify as black, or other ethnic minority. There are currently two positions as black representative, one open place and one women's place, the latter to be held only by self-identifying women. They are elected to help tackle racism in the campaign and support black LGBT people in society and education.

Disabled 
The Disabled representatives come from and are elected by a caucus of delegates who identify as Disabled. There is currently one position as Disabled representative. They are elected to help tackle ableism in the campaign and support Disabled LGBT people in society and education.

Open place 
The open representatives are elected by delegates and can be contested by any delegate. There are currently three positions as open representatives. They are elected to help the campaign in general.

Women's place 
The women's place representatives come from and are elected by a caucus of delegates who self identify as women. There are currently three positions as women's representatives. They are elected to tackle sexism and help the campaign in general.

Steering committee
The committee is elected to set the agenda and compile the submitted motions and amendments for annual conference.

References

External links 
 Website

Higher education in the United Kingdom
National Union of Students (United Kingdom)
Groups of students' unions
LGBT and education
LGBT organisations in England
LGBT youth organisations based in the United Kingdom